The Citrus Coast League (CCL) is a high school athletic conference in California that is affiliated with the CIF Southern Section. Established in 2018, the league consists primarily of small public high schools in Ventura County, with one member each in Los Angeles and Santa Barbara counties. Most CCL schools competed previously as members of the Tri-County Athletic Association, with Hueneme High School joining from the Pacific View League.

In 2019, Malibu and Santa Clara high schools switched their 11-man football programs to an eight-man format, citing a lack of players. As a result, both schools no longer compete in the Citrus Coast League in that sport.

Member schools
 Carpinteria High School (2018–present)
 Channel Islands High School (2022–present; all sports except football)
 Fillmore High School (2018–present)
 Hueneme High School (2018–present)
 Malibu High School (2018–present; all sports except football)
 Nordhoff High School (2018–present)
 Santa Paula High School (2018–present)

Former members
 Santa Clara High School (2018, football only; switched to 8-man football)

Sports
The Citrus Coast League sponsors the following sports:

Fall season
Football (11-man)
Cross country
Girls' volleyball
Girls' tennis
Boys' water polo
Girls' golf

Winter season
Basketball
Soccer
Girls' water polo
Wrestling

Spring season
Baseball
Boys' golf
Softball
Swimming and diving
Boys' tennis
Track and field
Boys' volleyball

Notes

References

CIF Southern Section leagues
Sports in Ventura County, California
Sports in Los Angeles County, California
Sports in Santa Barbara County, California